Glyptobaris is a genus of flower weevils in the family of beetles known as Curculionidae. There are about 15 described species in Glyptobaris.

Species
These 15 species belong to the genus Glyptobaris:

 Glyptobaris amazonica Casey, 1922 c
 Glyptobaris amnicola Casey, 1922 c
 Glyptobaris basalis Bondar, 1946 c
 Glyptobaris evulsa Hustache, A., 1938 c
 Glyptobaris lecontei Champion, 1909 i c b
 Glyptobaris liturata Hustache, A., 1938 c
 Glyptobaris nana Hustache, A., 1938 c
 Glyptobaris plicicollis Schaufuss, C. [or L.W.?], 1866 c
 Glyptobaris rugata Champion, G.C., 1909 c
 Glyptobaris rugicollis Casey, T.L., 1892 c
 Glyptobaris signatus Bondar, 1946 c
 Glyptobaris simplex Champion, G.C., 1909 c
 Glyptobaris solarii Champion, G.C., 1909 c
 Glyptobaris spinigera Champion, G.C., 1909 c
 Glyptobaris viduata Hustache, A., 1938 c

Data sources: i = ITIS, c = Catalogue of Life, g = GBIF, b = Bugguide.net

References

Further reading

External links

 

Baridinae
Articles created by Qbugbot